Pohledy is a municipality and village in Svitavy District in the Pardubice Region of the Czech Republic. It has about 300 inhabitants.

Administrative parts
The village of Horní Hynčina is an administrative part of Pohledy.

References

Villages in Svitavy District